Limacospora is a genus of fungi in the Halosphaeriaceae family. This is a monotypic genus, containing the single species Limacospora sundica.

References

Microascales
Monotypic Sordariomycetes genera